HyperStealth Biotechnology Corporation is a Canadian manufacturer of military camouflage uniforms. It was founded in 1999. It is based in Maple Ridge, British Columbia near Vancouver. Its chief executive officer and president is Guy Cramer.

As of 2017, it has made camouflages for the armies of  Jordan, Chile and the United Arab Emirates and Afghanistan. According to The New York Times, the United States federal government (USFG) spent $28 million more on their uniforms for the Afghan National Army between 2007 and 2017 than they could have with another camouflage pattern. They also have a patent pending to use the Quantum Stealth (Invisibility Cloak) to amplify output of solar panels and it has been successful so far. 

HyperStealth has also been featured around the world in the news, science articles, magazines, T.V. news and interviews, and YouTube.

References

Canadian companies established in 1999
Companies based in British Columbia